Gerald Goodhardt (1930 - 7 May 2020) was a marketing scientist.

Career
Professor Goodhardt began his career working as a statistician for Attwood Panels, and later Aske Research with Andrew Ehrenberg.  From 1981-95 he was Sir John E Cohen Professor of Consumer Studies at The City University Business School.

Apart from being the Chairman of the Board at the Ehrenberg-Bass Institute for Marketing Science, Professor Gerald Goodhardt was Emeritus Professor, City University; Visiting Professor, Kingston University and also a Visiting Research Associate, South Bank University. Formerly Sir John E Cohen Professor of Consumer Studies, and Dean of the City University Business School, Gerald has spent 20 years in industry and commerce prior to 20 years as an academic. He has served as Chairman of the Market Research Society (Gold Medalist in 1969 and 1996) and as Honorary Secretary of the Royal Statistical Society. Gerald was also founding President of the Market Research Benevolent Association, published extensively in marketing and statistical journals, mainly in quantitative aspects of consumer behaviour and the audience's use of broadcast media.

Research
In the early 1980s, with Andrew Ehrenberg and Chris Chatfield, he extended the NBD model to account for brand choices.  Finally published in 1984 the NBD-Dirichlet model of brand choice successfully modeled the repeated category and brand purchases within a wide variety of markets.  'The Dirichlet', as it became known, accounts for a number of empirical generalisations, including Double Jeopardy, the Duplication of Purchase law, and Natural Monopoly.  It has been shown to hold over different product categories, countries, time, and for both subscription and repertoire repeat-purchase markets.  It has been described as one of the most famous empirical generalisations in marketing. Independently, Bemmaor  and Schmittlein, Bemmaor and Morrison published the same model in Marketing Science and showed a variety of its statistical properties, in particular when it reduces to the simple NBD model. They labelled the univariate model as Beta Binomial/Negative Binomial Distribution (NBD/BB in Bemmaor 1981 and BB/NBD in Schmittlein, Bemmaor and Morrison 1985). The model has since been extensively applied both by academics and marketing research consultancy firms.

References

External links
Ehrenberg-Bass Institute for Marketing Science

1930 births
2020 deaths
British marketing people
British social scientists
Academics of London South Bank University
Academics of Kingston University
Academics of City, University of London
Fellows of the Royal Statistical Society